A total solar eclipse occurred at the ascending node of the Moon's orbit on Tuesday, July 2, 2019, with an eclipse magnitude of 1.0459. Totality was visible from the southern Pacific Ocean east of New Zealand to the Coquimbo Region in Chile and Central Argentina at sunset, with the maximum of 4 minutes 33 seconds visible from the Pacific Ocean. The Moon was only 2.4 days before perigee (Perigee on July 5, 2019), making it fairly large.

Another solar eclipse occurred one lunar year after this eclipse, on June 21, 2020.  A total solar eclipse crossed this region of the Earth on December 14, 2020.

Images

Visibility
A solar eclipse occurs when the Moon passes between Earth and the Sun, thereby totally or partly obscuring the image of the Sun for a viewer on Earth. A total solar eclipse occurs when the Moon's apparent diameter is larger than the Sun's, blocking all direct sunlight, turning day into darkness. Totality occurs in a narrow path across Earth's surface, with the partial solar eclipse visible over a surrounding region thousands of kilometres wide.

Following the North American solar eclipse of August 21, 2017, Astronomers Without Borders collected eclipse glasses for redistribution to Latin America and Asia for the 2019 eclipses.

Totality travelled over areas with low levels of humidity and light pollution, allowing for very good observations.  Several major observatories experienced totality, including the European Southern Observatory.

Oeno Island
The first land surface and the only Pacific island from which totality was visible is Oeno Island, an uninhabited atoll in the Pitcairn Islands.

Chile
Totality was visible in a large portion of Coquimbo Region and small parts of Atacama Region. Cities in the path included La Serena and La Higuera. Approximately 300,000 people visited La Serena to view the event. Tickets to view the eclipse from the European Southern Observatory were sold for US$2000 each.

Argentina
Totality was visible in the provinces of San Juan, La Rioja, San Luis, Córdoba, Santa Fe, and Buenos Aires. Cities in the path included San Juan and Río Cuarto. The path of totality finished at the Samborombon Bay, where the eclipsed sunset was observed from San Clemente del Tuyu.

Gallery

Related eclipses

Eclipses of 2019 
 A partial solar eclipse on January 6.
 A total lunar eclipse on January 21.
 A total solar eclipse on July 2.
 A partial lunar eclipse on July 16.
 An annular solar eclipse on December 26.

Tzolkinex 
 Preceded: Solar eclipse of May 20, 2012
 Followed: Solar eclipse of August 12, 2026

Half-Saros cycle 
 Preceded: Lunar eclipse of June 26, 2010
 Followed: Lunar eclipse of July 6, 2028

Tritos 
 Preceded: Solar eclipse of August 1, 2008
 Followed: Solar eclipse of June 1, 2030

Solar Saros 127 
 Preceded: Solar eclipse of June 21, 2001
 Followed: Solar eclipse of July 13, 2037

Inex 
 Preceded: Solar eclipse of July 22, 1990
 Followed: Solar eclipse of June 11, 2048

Triad 
 Preceded: Solar eclipse of August 31, 1932
 Followed: Solar eclipse of May 3, 2106

Solar eclipses of 2018–2021

Saros 127

Inex series 

In the 19th century:

 Solar Saros 120: Total Solar Eclipse of 1816 Nov 19
 Solar Saros 121: Hybrid Solar Eclipse of 1845 Oct 30
 Solar Saros 122: Annular Solar Eclipse of 1874 Oct 10

In the 22nd century:

 Solar Saros 130: Total Solar Eclipse of 2106 May 3
 Solar Saros 131: Annular Solar Eclipse of 2135 Apr 13
 Solar Saros 132: Hybrid Solar Eclipse of 2164 Mar 23
 Solar Saros 133: Total Solar Eclipse of 2193 Mar 03

Metonic series

References

Additional sources

External links

 solar-eclipse.de: The total solar eclipse of 07/02/2019
 eclipseportal.com: Total Solar Eclipse July, 02, 2019
 JulyEclipse.com has free educational materials aimed at teaching children about the July 2019 Solar Eclipse. They are available in English, Spanish, and Portuguese.

2019 07 02
2019 07 02
2019 in science
2019 in New Zealand
2019 in the Pitcairn Islands
2019 in Chile
2019 in Argentina
July 2019 events
July 2019 events in Oceania
July 2019 events in South America